Ajeeb Dastaan Hai Ye ( It's a strange tale) is an Indian television soap opera produced by Ekta Kapoor under her banner Balaji Telefilms. The series was broadcast on Life OK and streamed online after airing on television on Hotstar.

The show was the television debut of Bollywood actress Sonali Bendre in the fiction genre. The title of the show Ajeeb Dastaan Hai Yeh is inspired by the title song of the 1960 Bollywood film Dil Apna Aur Preet Parai, originally sung by Lata Mangeshkar.

The show was broadcast between 7 October 2014 and 6 March 2015.

Plot
Shobha (Sonali Bendre) is a middle-aged housewife married to a politician, Samarth (Harsh Chhaya). The couple has two little children and a seemingly happy marriage until Shobha discovers that her husband is having an affair, and is involved in corruption through a news broadcast. She is completely distraught and unsure of what to expect from life after it becomes the new national gossip, but she decides to pursue a career for the benefit of her children and her husband's innocent family.

Her new journey to be independent goes through major ups and downs, whilst she tries to figure out her seemingly arrogant, yet mysterious boss, Vikram Ahuja(Apurva Agnihotri) . He inspires her to make an identity for herself and not rely on the one her husband has left her with. As she gets to know the man Vikram is, they form an unnamed, yet a divine bond. As her kids fall in love with the man too, their relationship becomes so strong that it's pure.

Ajeeb Dastaan Hai Yeh is a rom-com that revolves around the lives of Vikram and Shobha, and their families—how they overcome their pasts for a better future.

Cast

Main
 Sonali Bendre as Shobha Sachdev
 Apurva Agnihotri as Vikram Ahuja
 Harsh Chhaya as Samarth Sachdev, Shobha's ex-husband

Recurring
 Vivana Singh  as Sarika Sachdev/Madhura Kashyap
 Alka Amin as Sharda Sachdev, Samarth's mother
 Devyansh Tapuriah  as Rehaan
 Kreesha Shah  as Jia
 Ruchi Savarn as Garima Ganguly
 Sandeep Rajora as Tarun
 Anurag Sharma as Sandeep
 Mihika Verma as Shikha
 Rushad Rana as Saurabh Ganguly
 Gaurav Nanda as Anil
 Prashant Chawla  as Sanjay Ganguly
 Unknown  as Abhay, Sarika's husband
 Garima Kapoor as Riddhima
 Preeti Gupta as Shobha's friend

Reception 
Initially, the show was seen as fresh take on the saas-bahu trope in Indian television serials. Explaining why the show was taken off air, the show's co-creator Ekta Kapoor said that audiences were not ready for progressive shows that showed a married woman choosing to move on even after her husband mistreats her. In another interview in 2017, Kapoor said that the show was poorly received as the idea of a woman in a bad marriage moving out and leaving her husband did not match the general accepted thought process of a family despite the show's depiction of reality.

International broadcasting 

South Africa StarLife     An Unusual Tale September 30, 2021 107 episodes 18:00

References

External links
 
 Official website on Hotstar

Balaji Telefilms television series
Life OK original programming
2014 Indian television series debuts
2015 Indian television series endings